Carl Turich (born 1 January 1969) is an Australian former professional tennis player.

Turich, a Western Australian of Croatian descent, trained at the AIS in Canberra. He competed on the professional tour in the late 1980s and had a best world ranking of 358, with two main draw appearances at the Australian Open.

ATP Challenger finals

Doubles: 1 (0–1)

References

External links
 
 

1969 births
Living people
Australian male tennis players
Tennis people from Western Australia
Australian people of Croatian descent
Australian Institute of Sport tennis players